Marco Paradeda (born 15 January 1945) is a Brazilian sailor. He competed at the 1976 Summer Olympics and the 1984 Summer Olympics.

References

External links
 

1945 births
Living people
Brazilian male sailors (sport)
Olympic sailors of Brazil
Sailors at the 1976 Summer Olympics – 470
Sailors at the 1984 Summer Olympics – 470
Sportspeople from Porto Alegre